Mike Alexander (born July 31, 1957) is a retired American racing driver.  He won the NASCAR Weekly Series national championship in 1983.  He also raced in Winston Cup and in the Busch Series.

Career before national racing
Alexander was the 1978 and 1992 track champion at the historic Nashville International Raceway, now known as Fairgrounds Speedway.

In 1983, driving Late Models on paved tracks for car owner Bobby Ray Jones, he won the NASCAR Weekly Racing Series national championship, and won the NASCAR Grand American Stock Car championship in its final year.  Alexander won 31 of the 56 races that he entered.  Most were at Nashville, Tennessee or Birmingham, Alabama (where he won the track championship), but some ranged as far as South Carolina or Florida.  He was born to a family well-known in the Nashville automotive scene who operated several area franchised dealerships.

2020 Brought Alexander back to the fairgrounds with ARCA driver Mason Mingus behind the wheel of the famed 84 throwback to the BRJ days in the 80’s. The two paired up with longtime Fairgrounds member Ben Pruitt and Mark Lawson. 
2021 plans are the same as 2020 with Mingus driving and Alexander on top of the box.

NASCAR career

Winston Cup Series
Alexander began his national-level racing career in the Winston Cup Series. He made the field in the Music City 420 in 1980 and performed fairly well, finishing tenth. He ran part of the 1981 season for Bob Rogers. Most of his finishes in 1981 were in the Top 15 (if he was running). He ran most of the first 22 races in 1984 for car owner Dave Marcis with limited success. In 1985 he ran a partial schedule for Sims Brothers and Sadler Brothers. He drove for the Stavola Brothers for the final 16 races in 1988, substituting for the injured Bobby Allison. He had his greatest success in 1988, with six top-ten finishes in 18 starts, including a career best 3rd-place finish at the season finale at the Atlanta Motor Speedway. In 1989, Alexander drove the Stavola Brothers car at Daytona, but he was hampered by the effects of an injury in the Snowball Derby at Five Flags Speedway in Pensacola, FL the previous December, and resigned from the ride. His final stint in Cup was the first seven races for Bobby Allison Motorsports in 1990.

Busch Series
Alexander ran a partial season in the Busch Series in 1986. He ran full-time in 1987 and 1988, and had a win in both seasons (1987 Langley Speedway) and (1988 Hickory Motor Speedway). He had three career poles. He had 31 Top 10 finishes in his 71 Busch starts.

Motorsports career results

NASCAR
(key) (Bold – Pole position awarded by qualifying time. Italics – Pole position earned by points standings or practice time. * – Most laps led.)

Winston Cup Series

Daytona 500

Busch Series

ARCA Talladega SuperCar Series
(key) (Bold – Pole position awarded by qualifying time. Italics – Pole position earned by points standings or practice time. * – Most laps led.)

References

External links

Living people
1957 births
People from Franklin, Tennessee
Racing drivers from Tennessee
NASCAR drivers
ARCA Menards Series drivers
American Speed Association drivers